Shelby Fredrick "Sheb" Wooley (April 10, 1921 – September 16, 2003) was an American singer, songwriter, actor and comedian. He recorded a series of novelty songs including the 1958 hit rock and roll comedy single "The Purple People Eater" and under the name Ben Colder the country hit "Almost Persuaded No. 2". As an actor, he portrayed Cletus Summers, the principal of Hickory High School & assistant coach in the 1986 film Hoosiers; Ben Miller, brother of Frank Miller in the film High Noon; Travis Cobb in The Outlaw Josey Wales, and also had a co-starring role as scout Pete Nolan in the television series Rawhide. Wooley is also credited as the voice actor who provided the Wilhelm scream and all of the other stock sound effects for Thomas J. Valentino's Major Records during the 1940s.

Early life
Sheb Wooley was born in 1921 in Erick, Oklahoma, the third son of William C. Wooley and Ora E. Wooley.  He had two older brothers, Logan and Hubert, as well as a younger brother, William.  Federal census records for 1930 and 1940 identify Sheb's father only as a "Farmer", although the family's livestock holdings apparently included horses, for Sheb learned to ride at an early age and became a working cowboy and later an accomplished rodeo rider. 

Wooley married for the first time in 1940, wedding 17-year-old Melva Miller, a cousin of Roger Miller who would later become a successful song writer and actor himself. Wooley became friends with Miller when he lived in Oklahoma.  He taught the boy how to play guitar chords and bought him his first fiddle.

When the United States entered World War II, Wooley tried to enlist in the military but was unsuccessful due to his numerous rodeo injuries. Instead, in the early 1940s he worked in the oil industry and as a welder. In 1946 he moved to Fort Worth, Texas, where he earned a living as a country-western musician recording songs and traveling for three years with a band throughout the South and Southwest.  In Fort Worth he also married for the second time, to Edna Talbott Bunt, a young widow with an infant son named Gary. The three of them left Texas in 1950 and moved to Hollywood, where Wooley hoped to establish himself as an actor or singer in film or in the rapidly expanding medium of television.

Music career
At the age of 15, with a talent for music, Wooley formed a band called the "Plainview Melody Boys", that periodically performed on radio at station KASA in Elk City, Oklahoma. He started his recording career in 1945. His music encompassed Western swing, country, hillbilly, rock and roll,  pop and novelty songs. At the start of the 1950s, Wooley began fusing Western swing with rhythm and blues, but later in his career his music would shift to the more commercial Nashville sound.

In 1958, Wooley earned considerable fame with his hit rock and roll comedy single, "The Purple People Eater", utilizing tape manipulation inspired by the David Seville single "Witch Doctor". In the United Kingdom, he enjoyed a minor hit with the comedy single "Luke the Spook" on the flip side of "My Only Treasure", a ballad in the country and western tradition. Wooley also had a string of country hits, with his "That's My Pa" reaching No. 1 of Billboard's Hot C&W Sides chart in March 1962. That same year, Wooley intended to record the song "Don't Go Near The Indians", but he was delayed by an acting job. Meanwhile, Rex Allen recorded the song, and it was a hit. Wooley, however, would do the sequel to the song, "Don't Go Near the Eskimos", about a boy in Alaska named Ben Colder (had never "been colder"). This sequel was so successful that Wooley continued using the name Ben Colder, with one of his later recordings being "Shaky Breaky Car" (which parodied the song "Achy Breaky Heart"). In December 1963, his single "Hootenanny Hoot" became a top-10 hit in Australia; and in 1967 his song "The Love-in" (1967) was recognized as an acerbic commentary on the 1960s' counterculture.

In the late 1960s and early 1970s, Wooley became a regular on the television series Hee Haw and wrote the theme song for that long-running series. On Hee Haw he often appeared as the character Ben Colder, playing him as a drunken country songwriter.  Outside of Hee Haw, Wooley released music and performed as Ben Colder, although he would still sing under his own name as well. Wooley continued to tour internationally and make personal concert appearances until his death in 2003. Wooley recorded his last written song just four days before he died.

Acting career

TV Westerns 

Wooley's work in syndicated TV series included appearances on The Range Rider, portraying outlaw Jim Younger on Stories of the Century (1954), and five appearances on  The Adventures of Kit Carson (1951-1955).

He appeared in The Lone Ranger episodes “Stage to Estacado” (1953); “Wake of War" (1953);  "Message to Fort Apache" (1954), and "Wanted: The Lone Ranger" (1955). He portrayed Bill Bronson on The Cisco Kid,  Harry Runyon in "The Unmasking" on My Friend Flicka, and Shev Jones in "The Iron Trail" on Cheyenne. He appeared twice on The Life and Legend of Wyatt Earp.

Wooley's big break professionally came when he was cast as the drover Pete Nolan on Rawhide (1958–1965). Wooley also wrote and directed some of the episodes.

Films 
Wooley appeared in dozens of Western films from the 1950s through the 1990s. He was in Rocky Mountain (1950), and he portrayed outlaw Ben Miller in High Noon (1952) and Baxter in Terror in a Texas Town (1958).

He also acted in major films, including Giant, The Outlaw Josey Wales, Silverado, and in Hoosiers.

The "Wilhelm scream"
Sheb Wooley is also credited as the voice actor for the Wilhelm scream, having appeared on a memo as a voice extra for Distant Drums in which he had an acting role. This was later confirmed by his widow Linda Dotson. The stock recording of the distinctive scream has been used by sound-effects teams in over 200 films.

Personal life
Wooley was married five times. His first wife was Melva Miller, whom he married in 1940. Six years later he married Edna Talbott Bunt in Fort Worth, Texas. His third wife was Beverly Irene Addington. He and Beverly remained together for 19 years and adopted one daughter, Chrystie Lynn. Then, in 1985, he married Deanna Grughlin and then his manager Linda Dotson, who already had a daughter, Shauna.

Wooley was diagnosed with leukaemia in 1996, which forced him to retire from public performing in 1999. After seven years of battling the illness, he died at the age of 82 at the Skyline Medical Center in Nashville, Tennessee, on September 16, 2003.  He was entombed in Hendersonville Memory Gardens in Hendersonville, Tennessee.

Awards
Wooley was the recipient of numerous awards over the years for his accomplishments as a singer, actor, and writer for both comedic and dramatic productions. In 1968 he received the Country Music Association's Comedian of the Year Award.  He also received the 1992 Songwriter of the Year, two Golden Boot Awards, and he won the Western Heritage Award for nine consecutive years in recognition of his film and television work in Westerns.

Discography

Albums

Singles

Filmography

References

External links

 Official website
 [ AllMusic entry]
 
 
 

1921 births
2003 deaths
20th-century American male actors
20th-century American male singers
20th-century American singers
American country singer-songwriters
American male film actors
American male pop singers
American male singer-songwriters
American male television actors
American novelty song performers
American parodists
American rock singers
Burials in Tennessee
Comedians from Oklahoma
Comedians from Tennessee
Country musicians from Oklahoma
Country musicians from Tennessee
Country musicians from Texas
Deaths from leukemia
Deaths from cancer in Tennessee
Male actors from Oklahoma
Male actors from Fort Worth, Texas
MGM Records artists
Parody musicians
People from Erick, Oklahoma
Rock and roll musicians
Singer-songwriters from Oklahoma
Singer-songwriters from Tennessee
Singer-songwriters from Texas
Western (genre) television actors
Western swing performers